Carex leporinella is a species of sedge known by the common name Sierra hare sedge.

Distribution
This sedge is native to the western United States from California, such as the Sierra Nevada, to Wyoming, where it grows in moist mountain habitats, such as meadows.

Description
Carex leporinella produces dense clumps of thin stems up to about 30 centimeters tall. There are a few leaves at each stem, each very narrow and generally folded or rolled.

The open inflorescence is a cluster of several golden to brown spikes, their flowers covered with reddish-brown, white-edged scales. The fruit is coated in a winged, curved, light-colored sac called a perigynium.

External links
Jepson Manual Treatment - Carex leporinella
Flora of North America
Carex leporinella - Photo gallery

leporinella
Flora of the Western United States
Flora of California
Flora of the Sierra Nevada (United States)
Flora of the West Coast of the United States
Plants described in 1917
Flora without expected TNC conservation status